New School is an Italian sitcom television series produced by DeA Kids in collaboration with Beachwood Canyon Productions and Maestro Production. The series started in December 2017. In 2019 BBC made an accord with DeAgostini and in future the series will be aired also in other Countries.

Plot
The series talks about the adventures of a group of freshmen of the McGaffin International Middle School, an international middle school in which there is a legendary flush toilet. This is a broken flush toilet in which is kept the Wall of Celebrities, a wall on which are hung the photos of the 12 Legends of the school, that are the most popular students that during the course of the years were able to accomplish feats so memorable to become myths. To become part of the Wall of Celebrities, students need to accomplish feats and be voted by other students through an app called App of the Wall of Celebrities. Only who will receive one million of points will be able to be part of the Wall of Celebrities.

Cast and characters
 Matteo Valentini as Nick Rivellini, an 11 years old boy that wants to be on the Wall to be more popular and overcome his insecurity. He is friend with Rudy and is in an unreciprocated love with Anna. He is very good in singing but terrible in dancing.
 Edoardo Tarantini as Rudy Hansen, an 11 years old boy that is friend with Nick, that he knows from when they were in kindergarten. He is also the older brother of Alice. He is bungling but quite creative and very kind despite a little childish. He is not very much interested in popularity and girls but he is very appassionate of sci-fi movies and superheroes, and his favorite superhero is Ragazzo Lupo. He is hopeless in singing but very good in dancing and he has a web channel in which he publishes his dance tutorials.
 Cloe Romagnoli as Anna De Martino, a 12 years old girl that is friend of Nick and Rudy and that is in love with Justin. She is quite intelligent and pragmatic but her love for Justin get her really easily distracted.
 Noemi Brazzoli as Vivien Mandelli, a 12 years old girl very popular in the school and that indeed is always stably in the firsts positions on the App. Thanks to her popularity almost no one dares to contradict her. She is also the head cheerleader. She is very egocentric and self-regarding and always talk of herself in third person and often takes selfies. In the first season she starts to date Justin not much for love but just because she thinks that is natural that the most attractive girl would date the most attractive boy. She is allergic to cats. 
 Diego Delpiano as Justin Price, a 12 years old boy very popular. He loves a lot sports and takes a lot of care about his look and shape and constantly exercise to be in good shape and develop a good muscular system but he is not very intelligent and is quite naive. He has a teddy bear, Orso. He also has some immature mannerisms like being afraid of darkness, still needing to keep near him his teddy bear to sleep and sometimes he starts to laugh without motivation.
 Alice Papes as Alice Hansen, a 9 years old girl, little sister of Rudy and a genius. Very often she spends time in labs, with test tubes or reading and she is able to put a point on surprising inventions and cutting-edge scientific research. She still sleeps with her peluche, Piripocchio. But she really wishes to be more included and to have friends.
 Andrea Castronovo and Paolo Castronovo as Tim and Tom, two identical twins. They don't study much but thanks to their cunning, physical strength and coordination are almost always able to obtain what they wish and compensate their lack of study by being sure to obtain others' work or by cheating. Despite not being interested to be part of the Wall, very often they challenge others, especially Nick and Rudy, for fun and the sake of it. They are almost impossible to distinguish from each other, but, while Tim is allergic to cats, Tom isn't.
 Nicole Di Julio as Charlotte. She started to appear during the second season. She is a gruff bully and is able to scare everyone, included the principal, and her only weak spot is her big crush on Nick, that she nicknamed Sogliola.
 Alberto Torquati as Mr. Peter Spencer, the principal of the school. He tries to always adopt a rigid and severe attitude with his students who, however, do not respect him much. Precisely for this reason the best way to get something from him is to congratulate and please him. Mr. Spencer has only two weapons to try to be respected by the students that are to send them to his office as punishment and seize their belongings. He is very scared of the superintendent, that control him remotely. He has a lot of hobbies and passions like baking but his life outside school is mysterious. Mr. Spencer loves traditions and the story of the school, the rites, the special days and the ceremonies. He has in high regard the founder of the school, Mr. McGaffin. One of his duties is to give the announces at the start of every day with the mic in his office.
 Federica Fabiani as Miss Mastermind, the cook of the school. She is a very cold woman and doesn't smile very often. She also treats often with sarcasm the students. But the reason behind her attitude is how in the past a love story she had with Mr. Spencer didn't end well.
 Riccardo Diana as the superintendent. He never appears physically but he is heard during calls. He controls the work of the school.

Episodes

Soundtrack

The theme song of the series is My New School, written and composed by Teresa Pascarelli and Giovanni Maria Lori and sung by Matteo Valentini.

In the episode of the first season "il Vivienfest", Nick, Anna and Rudy perform in the fictitious robes of the Bandos. Let the Music in is presented, an unreleased song written by Teresa Pascarelli and Giovanni Maria Lori and sung by Matteo Valentini.

In the episode of the first season "Il grande talent show", Rudy (out of tune) sings in playback Listen to Me, actually sung by Nick: it is an unpublished song written by Teresa Pascarelli and Giovanni Maria Lori and sung by Matteo Valentini

In the second season episode "Il ballo di San Valentino - Seconda parte", the young singer Matteo Markus Bok performs with his hit In the Middle.

In the second season episode "Vita da rocker" Nick, Rudy and Vivien perform as the rock group "Gli schiaffi" with their biggest hit Slaps, an unpublished song written and composed by Teresa Pascarelli and Giovanni Maria Lori and sung by Matteo Valentini.

References 

2017 Italian television series debuts
Italian-language television shows
Children's television sitcoms
BBC television comedy